Uspekhi Matematicheskikh Nauk is a Russian mathematical journal, published by the Russian Academy of Sciences and Moscow Mathematical Society and translated into English as Russian Mathematical Surveys.

Uspekhi Matematicheskikh Nauk was founded in 1936, with Lazar Lyusternik as its editor-in-chief. Initially, it appeared irregularly, with issues devoted to specific topics within mathematics together with non-research articles about the work of different mathematical institutes in Russia and abroad. Its third issue, in 1937, was devoted to attacks on Nikolai Luzin, but in an anniversary issue 24 years later this politicization of the journal was downplayed. After a hiatus for World War II, the journal began publishing on a regular schedule in 1946.

Its translation, Russian Mathematical Surveys, began in 1960 and since 1997 has been published jointly by the London Mathematical Society, Turpion Ltd, and the Russian Academy of Sciences. Archives of the Russian originals are available online through the All-Russian Mathematical Portal.

Uspekhi Matematicheskikh Nauk successfully overcame the economic difficulties of the 90s and today it is an active publication - one of the leading mathematical journals in the world. Since 1988 its editorial board is headed by S. P. Novikov (born in 1938).

According to the Journal Citation Reports, its 2018 impact factor is 2.038

References

External links
Russian Mathematical Surveys, SCImago Journal Rank report

Mathematics journals
Publications established in 1936
Russian Academy of Sciences academic journals
Russian-language journals